The 1864 United States presidential election was the 20th quadrennial presidential election. It was held on Tuesday, November 8, 1864. Near the end of the American Civil War, incumbent President Abraham Lincoln of the National Union Party easily defeated the Democratic nominee, former General George B. McClellan, by a wide margin of 212–21 in the electoral college, with 55% of the popular vote. For the election, the Republican Party and some Democrats created the National Union Party, especially to attract War Democrats.

Despite some intra-party opposition from Salmon Chase and the Radical Republicans, Lincoln won his party's nomination at the 1864 National Union National Convention. Rather than re-nominate Vice President Hannibal Hamlin, the convention selected Andrew Johnson of Tennessee, a War Democrat, as Lincoln's running mate. John C. Frémont started to run as the nominee of the new Radical Democracy Party, which criticized Lincoln for being too moderate on the issue of racial equality, but Frémont withdrew from the race in September and that new party dissolved. The Democrats were divided between the Copperheads, who favored immediate peace with the Confederacy, and War Democrats, who supported the war. The 1864 Democratic National Convention nominated McClellan, a War Democrat, but adopted a platform advocating peace with the Confederacy, which McClellan rejected. The Confederacy seemed to have survival potential in summer 1864, but was visibly collapsing by election day in November.

Despite his early fears of defeat, Lincoln won strong majorities in the popular and electoral vote, partly as a result of the recent Union victory at the Battle of Atlanta. As the Civil War was still raging, no electoral votes were counted from any of the eleven southern states that had joined the Confederate States of America. Lincoln's re-election ensured that he would preside over the successful conclusion of the Civil War.

Lincoln's victory made him the first president to win re-election since Andrew Jackson in 1832, as well as the first Northern president to ever win re-election. Lincoln was assassinated less than two months into his second term, and he was succeeded by his vice president, Andrew Johnson, who favored quick restoration of the seceded states to the Union without protection for the former slaves. This led to conflict with the Republican-dominated Congress, culminating in his impeachment by the House of Representatives in 1868. He was acquitted in the Senate by one vote.

Background
The 1864 presidential election took place during the American Civil War. According to the Miller Center for the study of the presidency, the election was noteworthy for occurring at all, an unprecedented democratic exercise in the midst of a civil war.

A group of Republican dissidents who called themselves Radical Republicans formed a party named the Radical Democracy Party and nominated John C. Frémont as their candidate for president. Frémont later withdrew and endorsed Lincoln. In the Border States, War Democrats joined with Republicans as the National Union Party, with Lincoln at the head of the ticket. The National Union Party was a temporary name used to attract War Democrats and Border State Unionists who would not vote for the Republican Party. It faced off against the regular Democratic Party, including Peace Democrats.

Nominations
The 1864 presidential election conventions of the parties are considered below in order of the party's popular vote.

National Union Party nomination

National Union candidates:
 Abraham Lincoln, President of the United States
 Ulysses S. Grant, Commanding General from Illinois

National Union Party presidential candidates gallery

National Union Party vice presidential candidates gallery

Temporary split in the Republican Party

As the Civil War progressed, political opinions within the Republican Party began to diverge. Senators Charles Sumner and Henry Wilson from Massachusetts wanted the Republican Party to advocate constitutional amendments to prohibit slavery and guarantee racial equality before the law. Initially, not all northern Republicans supported such measures.

Democratic leaders hoped that the radical Republicans would put forth their own ticket in the election. The New York World newspaper, particularly interested in undermining the National Union Party, ran a series of articles predicting a delay for the National Union Convention until late in 1864 to allow Frémont time to collect delegates to win the nomination. Frémont supporters in New York City established a newspaper called the New Nation, which declared in one of its initial issues that the National Union Convention would be a "nonentity". The New York World also published false information (further purported by Samuel S. Cox) to limit Lincoln's popularity.

National Union Party

Before the election, some War Democrats joined the Republicans to form the National Union Party. With the outcome of the Civil War still in doubt, some political leaders, including Salmon P. Chase, Benjamin Wade, and Horace Greeley, opposed Lincoln's re-nomination on the grounds that he could not win. Chase himself became the only candidate to contest Lincoln's re-nomination actively, but he withdrew in March when a slew of Republican officials, including some within the state of Ohio upon whom Chase's campaign depended, endorsed Lincoln for re-nomination. Lincoln was still popular with most members of the Republican Party, and the National Union Party nominated him for a second term as president at their convention in Baltimore, Maryland, on June 7–8, 1864. The party platform included these goals: "pursuit of the war, until the Confederacy surrendered unconditionally; a constitutional amendment for the abolition of slavery; aid to disabled Union veterans; continued European neutrality; enforcement of the Monroe Doctrine; encouragement of immigration; and construction of a transcontinental railroad." It also praised the use of black troops and Lincoln's management of the war.

With incumbent vice president Hannibal Hamlin remaining indifferent about the prospect of a second term in office, Andrew Johnson, the former senator from and current military governor of Tennessee, was named as Lincoln's vice presidential running-mate. He had been governor of Tennessee from 1853 to 1857 and was elected by the legislature to the Senate in 1857. In his congressional service, he sought passage of the Homestead Bill which was enacted soon after he left his Senate seat in 1862. When the Southern slave states, including Tennessee, seceded, he remained firmly with the Union. He was the only sitting senator from a Confederate state who did not resign his seat upon learning of his state's secession. In 1862, Lincoln appointed him as military governor of Tennessee after most of it had been retaken. In 1864, Johnson was a logical choice as running mate for Lincoln, who wished to send a message of national unity in his re-election campaign, especially to ensure the electoral votes of the border states.

Others who were considered for the nomination, at one point or another, were former Senator Daniel Dickinson, Major General Benjamin Butler, Major General William Rosecrans, Joseph Holt, and former Treasury Secretary and Senator John Dix.

Democratic Party nomination

Democratic presidential candidates:
 George B. McClellan, General from New Jersey
 Thomas H. Seymour, Former Governor of Connecticut

Democratic Party candidates gallery

Democratic Party vice presidential candidates gallery

The Democratic Party was bitterly split between War Democrats and Peace Democrats, a group further divided among competing factions. Moderate Peace Democrats who supported the war against the Confederacy, such as Horatio Seymour, were preaching the wisdom of a negotiated peace. After the Union victory at the Battle of Gettysburg in 1863, moderate Peace Democrats proposed a negotiated peace that would secure Union victory. They believed this was the best course of action, because an armistice could finish the war without devastating the South. Radical Peace Democrats known as Copperheads, such as Thomas H. Seymour, declared the war to be a failure and favored an immediate end to hostilities without securing Union victory.

George B. McClellan vied for the presidential nomination. Additionally, friends of Horatio Seymour insisted on placing his name before the convention, which was held in Chicago, Illinois, on August 29–31, 1864. But on the day before the organization of that body, Horatio Seymour announced positively that he would not be a candidate.

Since the Democrats were divided by issues of war and peace, they sought a strong candidate who could unify the party. The compromise was to nominate pro-war General George B. McClellan for president and anti-war Representative George H. Pendleton for vice president. McClellan, a War Democrat, was nominated for president over the Copperhead Thomas H. Seymour. Pendleton, a close associate of the Copperhead Clement Vallandigham, balanced the ticket, since he was known for having strongly opposed the Union war effort. The convention adopted a peace platform – a platform McClellan personally rejected. McClellan supported the continuation of the war and restoration of the Union, but the party platform, written by Vallandigham, opposed this position.

Radical Democracy Party nomination

Radical Democracy Party candidates gallery

Radical Democracy Party vice presidential candidates gallery

The Radical Democracy Convention assembled in Ohio with delegates arriving on May 29, 1864. The New York Times reported that the hall which the convention organizers had planned to use had been double-booked by an opera troupe. Almost all delegates were instructed to support Frémont, with a major exception being the New York delegation, which was composed of War Democrats who supported Ulysses S. Grant. Various estimates of the number of delegates were reported in the press; The New York Times reported 156 delegates, but the number generally reported elsewhere was 350 delegates. The delegates came from 15 states and the District of Columbia. They adopted the name "Radical Democracy Party".

A supporter of Grant was appointed chairman. The platform was passed with little discussion, and a series of resolutions that bogged down the convention proceedings were voted down decisively. The convention nominated Frémont for president, and he accepted the nomination on June 4, 1864. In his letter, he stated that he would step aside if the National Union Convention would nominate someone other than Lincoln for president. John Cochrane was nominated for vice president.

General election

The 1864 election was the first time since 1812 that a presidential election took place during a war.

For much of 1864, Lincoln himself believed he had little chance of being re-elected. Confederate forces had triumphed at the Battle of Mansfield, the Battle of Cold Harbor, the Battle of Brices Cross Roads, the Battle of Kennesaw Mountain and the Battle of the Crater. In addition, the war was continuing to take a very high toll in terms of casualties with campaigns such as Grant's Overland Campaign and the perceived lack of progress. The prospect of a long and bloody war started to make the idea of "peace at all cost" offered by the Ultra Peace Democrats look more desirable. 

However, several political and military events eventually made Lincoln's re-election inevitable. In the first place, the Democrats had to confront the severe internal strains within their party at the Democratic National Convention. The political compromises made at the Democratic National Convention were contradictory and made McClellan's efforts to campaign seem inconsistent.

Secondly, the Democratic National Convention influenced Frémont's campaign. Frémont was appalled at the Democratic platform, which he described as "union with slavery". After three weeks of discussions with Cochrane and his supporters, Frémont withdrew from the race in September 1864. In his statement, Frémont declared that winning the Civil War was too important to divide the Republican vote. Although he still felt that Lincoln was not going far enough, the defeat of McClellan was of the greatest necessity. General Cochrane, who was a War Democrat, agreed and withdrew with Frémont. On September 23, 1864, Frémont also brokered a political deal in which Lincoln removed U.S. Postmaster General Montgomery Blair from office, and on September 24 Abraham Lincoln relieved Blair of his duty as Postmaster General. McClellan's chances of victory faded after Frémont withdrew from the presidential race.

Lastly, with the fall of Atlanta on September 2, there was no longer any question that a Union military victory was inevitable and close at hand.

In the end, the Union Party mobilized the full strength of both the Republicans and the War Democrats under the slogan "Don't change horses in the middle of a stream". It was energized as Lincoln made emancipation the central issue, and state Republican parties stressed the perfidy of the Copperheads.

Results
The American Civil War was in progress and unfinished during this election. Because eleven Southern states had declared secession from the Union and formed the Confederate States of America, only twenty-five states participated in the election.

Louisiana and Tennessee had recently been re-captured. They chose presidential electors, but their votes were rejected by Congress due to having recently seceded from the Union. Both states had voted for Lincoln, so it would not have changed the result in any case.

Three new states participated for the first time: Kansas, West Virginia, and Nevada.

Despite Kentucky's state government never seceding from the Union, the Commonwealth had an election participation rate decrease of almost 40% compared to the election of 1860.

McClellan won just three states: Kentucky, Delaware, and his home state of New Jersey. Lincoln won in every state he carried in 1860 except New Jersey, and also carried a state won four years earlier by Stephen Douglas (Missouri), one carried by John C. Breckinridge (Maryland) and all three newly admitted states (Kansas, Nevada and West Virginia). Altogether, 212 electoral votes were counted in Congress for Lincoln – more than enough to win the presidency even if all of the states in rebellion had participated and voted against him.

Lincoln was highly popular with soldiers and they in turn recommended him to their families back home. The following states allowed soldiers to cast ballots: California, Kansas, Kentucky, Maine, Michigan, Rhode Island, and Wisconsin. Out of the 40,247 army votes cast, Lincoln received 30,503 (75.8%) and McClellan 9,201 (22.9%), with the rest (543 votes) scattering (1.3%). Only soldiers from Kentucky gave McClellan a majority of their votes, and he carried the army vote in the state by a vote of 2,823 (70.3%) to 1,194 (29.7%).

Of the 1,129 counties making returns, Lincoln won in 728 (64.5%), while McClellan carried 400 (35.4%). One county (0.1%) in Iowa split evenly between Lincoln and McClellan.

This was the last election the Republicans won in Maryland until 1896.

Source (Popular Vote): Source (Electoral Vote): 

(a) The states in rebellion did not participate in the election of 1864.(b) The 17 electoral votes from Tennessee and Louisiana were rejected. Had they not been rejected, Lincoln would have received 229 electoral votes out of a total of 250, well in excess of the 126 required to win.(c) One elector from Nevada did not vote.

Geography of results

Cartographic gallery

Results by state
 Source (most states): Data from Walter Dean Burnham, Presidential ballots, 1836–1892 (Johns Hopkins University Press, 1955) pp. 247–57.
 Source (Tennessee): contemporary Chicago Tribune newspaper.

Source (Popular Vote):  Source (Electoral Vote):

Close states
States in red were won by Republican Abraham Lincoln; states in blue were won by Democrat George B. McClellan.

State where the margin of victory was under 1% (33 electoral votes):
 New York 0.92% (6,749 votes)

States where the margin of victory was under 5% (35 electoral votes):
 Connecticut 2.76% (2,405 votes)
 Pennsylvania 3.50% (20,075 votes)
 Delaware 3.62% (612 votes)

States where the margin of victory was under 10% (65 electoral vote):
 New Hampshire 5.12% (3,562 votes)
 New Jersey 5.68% (7,301 votes)
 Indiana 7.19% (20,189 votes) 
Michigan 7.20% (10,636 votes)
 Oregon 7.8% (1,431 votes)
 Illinois 8.8% (30,788 votes) (Tipping-Point State)

See also 
 American election campaigns in the 19th century
 Electoral history of Abraham Lincoln
 History of the United States (1849–1865)
 Second inauguration of Abraham Lincoln
 Third Party System
 1864–65 United States House of Representatives elections

Footnotes

References

Further reading
 Balsamo, Larry T. We Cannot Have Free Government without Elections': Abraham Lincoln and the Election of 1864", Journal of the Illinois State Historical Society (2001): 181–99.
Donald, David. Lincoln  (1995) pp. 516–544 online

 Dudley, Harold M.  "The Election of 1864," Mississippi Valley Historical Review, Vol. 18, No. 4 (Mar. 1932), pp. 500–18 in JSTOR
 Fehrenbacher, Don E. "The Making of a Myth: Lincoln and the Vice-Presidential Nomination in 1864". Civil War History 41.4 (1995): 273–290.
 Long, David E. Jewel of Liberty: Abraham Lincoln's Re-election and the End of Slavery (1994).
 Merrill, Louis Taylor.  "General Benjamin F. Butler in the Presidential Campaign of 1864". Mississippi Valley Historical Review 33 (March 1947): 537–70. in JSTOR
 Nelson, Larry E.  Bullets, Ballots, and Rhetoric: Confederate Policy for the United States Presidential Contest of 1864 University of Alabama Press, 1980.
Nevins, Allan. The War for the Union: The Organized War to Victory, 1864–1865 (vol 8 1971).  pp 97–143.
 Newman, Leonard.  "Opposition to Lincoln in the Elections of 1864", Science & Society, vol. 8, no. 4 (Fall 1944), pp. 305–27. In JSTOR.
 Phillip Shaw Paludan. The Presidency of Abraham Lincoln (University Press of Kansas, 1994) pp. 274–93.
 James G. Randall and Richard N. Current. Lincoln the President: Last Full Measure. Vol. 4 of Lincoln the President. 1955.
 Vorenberg, Michael. The Deformed Child': Slavery and the Election of 1864" Civil War History 2001 47(3): 240–57.
 Waugh, John C. Reelecting Lincoln: The Battle for the 1864 Presidency (1998).
 White, Jonathan W.  "Canvassing the Troops: the Federal Government and the Soldiers' Right to Vote" Civil War History 2004 50(3): 291–317.
 White, Jonathan W.  Emancipation, the Union Army, and the Reelection of Abraham Lincoln (Baton Rouge: LSU Press, 2014).
 Winther, Oscar O. "The soldier vote in the election of 1864." New York History 25.4 (1944): 440-458. online
Zornow, William Frank. Lincoln and the Party Divided (1954).  online

Primary sources
 Chester, Edward W. A guide to political platforms (1977) pp. 80–85 online
 Porter, Kirk H. and Donald Bruce Johnson, eds. National party platforms, 1840-1964 (1965) online 1840-1956

External links

 
 1864 popular vote by counties
 1864 State-by-state popular results
 Transcript of the 1864 Democratic Party Platform
 Harper's Weekly – Overview
 more from Harper's Weekly
 Presidential Election of 1864: A Resource Guide from the Library of Congress
 Election of 1864 in Counting the Votes 

 
Andrew Johnson
Abraham Lincoln
George B. McClellan
Politics of the American Civil War
Presidency of Abraham Lincoln
November 1864 events